Jabłonowski (plural: Jabłonowscy) is a Polish surname. Polish adjectives have different forms for the genders, Jabłonowska is the form for a female family member while a male would use Jabłonowski. A lot of but not all Jabłonowski belong to the House of Jabłonowski

Stanisław Jan Jabłonowski (1634–1702), Field and Great Hetman of the Crown
Anna Jabłonowska (1660–1727), mother of King  Stanisław I Leszczyński
Marianna Jabłonowska (1708–1765), married to Jan Wielopolski
Aleksander Jan Jabłonowski (d. 1723), Great Chorąży
Józef Aleksander Jabłonowski (1711–1777), Stolnik, voivode
Antoni Barnaba Jabłonowski (1732–1799), voiode, castellan
Dorota Barbara Jabłonowska (1760–1844), married to Józef Klemens Czartoryski
Władysław Franciszek Jabłonowski (1769–1802), Polish and French general.
Leszek Jabłonowski (b. 1954), Polish fencer.

See also
Yablonovsky (disambiguation) Russian spelling of the surname and toponym

Polish-language surnames